Lurex is the registered brand name of the Lurex Company, Ltd. for a type of yarn with a metallic appearance. The yarn is made from synthetic film, onto which a metallic aluminium, silver, or gold layer has been vaporized. "Lurex" may also refer to cloth created with the yarn. The word “lurex” is absent in the English language as a common noun: this is the name of the trademark and the company Lurex Company Limited, which launched the production of such yarn based on nylon and polyester — Lurex in the 1970s. The name was based on the English lure — “temptation; attractiveness”.

The Lurex Company
Hugo Wolfram, father of mathematician Stephen Wolfram, served as Managing Director of the Lurex Company; he was also author of three novels.

Lurex in media

Lurex has been a popular material for movie and television costumes.  For example, the bodysuit worn by actress Julie Newmar as Catwoman in the Batman TV series of the 1960s is constructed of black Lurex.

It was also seen in the slasher movie franchise Scream as the killer Ghostface costume known as Father Death to conceal the identity during the murder sprees. Originally it was going to be white but concerns was made to regarding comparisons of the Ku Klux Klan. 

Referenced in Australian group AC/DC's song 'Rocker' - "Lurex socks, blue suede shoes, V8 car, and tattoos"

Its presence for 'sparkle' at the 1920s-themed 50th anniversary party for MOMA in New York City in 1979 was noted in a news story on the gala event.

Larry Lurex was a name sometimes used by Queen lead singer Freddie Mercury with a few records being released under that name.
https://queenvinyls.com/vinyls/7_inch_list/larry-lurex/

See also
Metallic fiber

References

External links
Official Lurex website

Yarn
Synthetic fibers
Technical fabrics